Jamshidi is a surname. Notable people with the surname include:

People
Alireza Jamshidi, Iranian Islamist
Khosrow Jamshidi, Iranian hematologist who invented the Jamshidi needle
Pejman Jamshidi, Iranian footballer

Other uses
Jamshidi (tribe), a sub-tribe of the Aymaq in western Afghanistan
Jamshidi needle, a needle for performing bone marrow biopsy

See also
Aymāq

Iranian-language surnames